Club Atlético Mitre is an Argentine sports club located in the Santiago del Estero. The club is mostly known for its football team, that currently plays in Primera B Nacional, the second division of Argentine football league system.

Other sports practised at the club are basketball, basque pelota, bowls, cestoball, and cycling.

History 
The club was founded on April 2, 1907 by Francisco Igounet, his daughter and his father-in-law. After a friendly football match between "Mendoza" and "Mitre" with the second team being the winner, the club was established naming it "Club Atlético Mitre" honoring former president of Argentina who had died a few years before. The institution choose the yellow and black colors inspired on Uruguayan club CURCC (today Peñarol).

One of the most notable Mitre's footballers, Segundo Luna, was part of the Argentina national team that won a silver medal at the 1928 Summer Olympics.

Mitre was the first team to achieve 6 consecutive titles in the Liga Santiagueña de Fútbol, the regional league of the province. The club has won a total of 31 local championships to date.

The squad also participated in the 1970 Copa Argentina and several Argentino A and Argentino B championships since 2002.

In 2017, Mitre promoted to Nacional B for its first time after defeating Gimnasia y Esgrima de Mendoza by 4–3 through penalty shoot-out in the playoffs final. The line-up for that match was: Alejandro Medina; Ricardo Tapia, Oscar Piris, Matías Moisés y Franco Ledesma; Facundo Juárez, Juan Ignacio Alessandroni, Leandro De Muner, Franco Ferrari; Joaquín Quinteros, David Romero. The team was managed by Arnaldo Sialle.

Mitre plays its home matches in the "Estadio Doctores Castiglione" situated in the "Barrio 8 de Abril" on Calle 3 de Febrero.

Titles

Regional 
 Liga Santiagueña de Fútbol
Champions (30): 1913, 1916, 1917, Anual 1926, Torneo de Honor 1926, Anual 1927, Torneo de Honor 1927, Anual 1928, Torneo de Honor 1928, Anual 1932, Torneo de Honor 1932, Anual de 1936, Primera División 1989, Primera División 1990, Primera División 1994, Liguilla Representación 1997, Clausura 1998, Liguilla Representación 1998, Apertura 1999, Anual 2002, Liguilla Representación 2007, Clausura 2009, Anual 2009, Clausura 2014, Apertura 2015, Clausura 2015

References

External links

Official site
Official Twitter

 
M
M
M
M